Dudley Township may refer to:

Dudley Township, Henry County, Indiana
Dudley Township, Haskell County, Kansas
Dudley Township, Hardin County, Ohio
Dudley Township, Clearwater County, Minnesota

Township name disambiguation pages